Colburn may refer to:

People
 Elanor Colburn (1866–1939), American painter
 Elliot Colburn (born 1992), British politician
 Henry Colburn (1780s–1855), British publisher
 Jeremiah Colburn (1815–1891), numismatist and antiquarian
 John F. Colburn (1859–1920), Hawaiian politician
 Lawrence Colburn (1949–2016), US soldier, interventionist in the My Lai Massacre
 Matt Colburn (born 1997), American football player
 Richard Colburn (born 1970), musician
 Richard F. Colburn (born 1950), American politician
 Warren Colburn (1793–1833), educator
 Zerah Colburn (locomotive designer) (1832–1870)
 Zerah Colburn (mental calculator) (1804–1839)

Places

United Kingdom 
 Colburn, North Yorkshire

United States 
 Colburn, Indiana
 Colburn, St. Joseph County, Indiana
 Colburn, Adams County, Wisconsin
 Colburn, Chippewa County, Wisconsin
 Colburn (community), Wisconsin

Other uses
 Colburn Automobile Company, Denver, Colorado 
 Colburn School, a music conservatory and performing arts school in Los Angeles

English-language surnames
Surnames of British Isles origin